The 29th General Assembly of Nova Scotia represented Nova Scotia between 1886 and 1890.

The Liberal Party led by William Stevens Fielding formed the government.

Michael J. Power was chosen as speaker for the house.

The assembly was dissolved on April 21, 1890.

List of Members 

Notes:

References 
 

Terms of the General Assembly of Nova Scotia
1886 establishments in Nova Scotia
1890 disestablishments in Nova Scotia